Korona may refer to:

Currencies
 Austro-Hungarian krone, the official currency of the Austro-Hungarian Empire from 1892, localised as korona in Hungarian
 Hungarian korona, the replacement currency of the Austro-Hungarian krone in post-World War I Hungary

Other uses
 Korona, Florida, a small unincorporated community in Flagler County, Florida, United States
 Korona, Lublin Voivodeship, a village in east Poland
 Korona Kielce, a football club based in Kielce, Poland
 Crown of the Polish Kingdom, a term used to differentiate the two parts of the Polish-Lithuanian Commonwealth
 Saint Corona, second century Christian martyr
 Novuss, also known as Korona, a game of physical skill

See also
Corona (disambiguation)
Coroana (disambiguation)
Crown (disambiguation)